This is a list of African-American newspapers that have been published in Hawaii. From the 1980s to the 2000s, there was consistently at least one African-American newspaper being published in Hawaii.

The history of the African-American press in Hawaii is comparatively brief, starting only with the publication of the short-lived monthly newspaper Harambee in 1974. Records remained so sparse that the founders of the Afro-Hawaiian News in 1987 were unaware of the previous newspaper's existence. As a result, some historians have listed Hawaii among the states that have never had an African-American newspaper.

Newspapers

See also  
List of African-American newspapers and media outlets
List of African-American newspapers in Alaska
List of newspapers in Hawaii

Works cited

References

Newspapers
Hawaii
African-American
African-American newspapers